Sale of the Century (stylized as $ale of the Century) is an American television game show that originally debuted on September 29, 1969, on NBC daytime. It was one of three NBC game shows to premiere on that date, the other two being the short-lived game shows Letters to Laugh-In and Name Droppers. The series aired until July 13, 1973, and a weekly syndicated series began that fall and ran for one season.

The rights to the show were purchased in 1980 by Australian TV mogul Reg Grundy, who produced a similar show called Great Temptation in the 1970s. Grundy subsequently launched an Australian version of Sale of the Century. Grundy's modified format was then used in a revived American Sale of the Century that aired on NBC from January 3, 1983 to March 24, 1989. It was one of three NBC game shows premiering on the same date, along with Hit Man and Just Men! (both of which aired for only 13 weeks), and—like its predecessor—spawned a syndicated edition that ran from January 7, 1985 to September 12, 1986. Grundy's format has also been adopted in other countries.

The game consists of contestants answering general knowledge questions. At certain points during the game, the player currently in the lead is offered an "Instant Bargain", a prize to keep regardless of the game's outcome, in exchange for a certain amount deducted from that contestant's score.

Actor Jack Kelly hosted the original series from 1969 to 1971, then decided to return to acting full-time. He was replaced by Joe Garagiola, who hosted the remainder of the daytime series plus the one season in syndication. Jim Perry then hosted both the NBC and syndicated 1980s versions. Al Howard was the executive producer of the initial 1969–1974 version, and for a short time was co-executive producer of the 1980s version with Robert Noah.

A short-lived revival of the series entitled Temptation, like the 2005 Australian revival, debuted in syndication on September 10, 2007, following a September 7 preview on MyNetworkTV. This series ran for one year.

Game format
Contestants answered general knowledge toss-up questions posed by the host, earning $5 for a correct answer or losing that amount for a miss. Unlike most other game shows of the time, though, only the first contestant to buzz in could answer a question; a miss took it out of play for the other two.

At certain points during the game, the contestant in the lead participated in an "Instant Bargain" and was offered the opportunity to purchase merchandise at a bargain price. The selling price for the item, generally the value of one or more questions, was then deducted from the contestant's score, and the prize was theirs to keep regardless of the game's outcome.

Depending upon the version, question values either remained at $5 or increased as the game progressed. Additional Instant Bargains were also offered. The contestant in the lead at the end of the game was declared the champion and used their final score to purchase a larger prize, or played a separate end game, which varied depending upon the version of the show.

1969–1974
From 1969 to 1973, the game featured three contestants, who all began with $25. Midway through the game, the question values doubled to $10. At first, the final round consisted of 30 seconds of $15 questions. Later, this was replaced with five $20 questions (called "The Century Round", as the total value of the questions was $100). If a contestant's total was reduced to zero (or lower), that contestant was eliminated from the game.

At certain points during gameplay, all contestants were offered the opportunity to purchase merchandise at a bargain price. The first contestant to buzz in after the prize was revealed purchased that prize, and the price was deducted from his or her score. The prices of all prizes offered were expressed much as one would hear in a department store (ending with "and 95 cents"), and the prices increased as the episode progressed (e.g., $7.95, $11.95, $14.95, $21.95). All prize values were rounded up to the nearest dollar before being subtracted from the score of the contestant who purchased the prize. Each Instant Bargain was hidden behind a curtain, and contestants could not buzz in before the curtain opened. A contestant who did buzz in early was penalized by having the cost of the Instant Bargain deducted from their score and being locked out of purchasing the prize.

The "Open House" round was played in early episodes of the original version, usually about halfway through a particular episode. Five prizes were presented to the contestants and each could buy as many of them as he or she wanted. Unlike Instant Bargains, multiple contestants could buy the same item. This was later replaced with an "Audience Sale" round in which three members of the studio audience guessed the "sale price" of an item. The one that bid closest without going over won the item. The three contestants could increase their score by correctly guessing which audience member would win.

During the last thirteen weeks of this series, and the aforementioned follow-up weekly syndicated series, two married couples competed instead of three individual contestants. Each couple was given $20 at the start of the game. On the syndicated version, the first round consisted of questions worth $5, and in the second questions were valued at $10. A series of five questions worth $20 each were asked to conclude the game. If either couple's score reached $0, both couples were given an additional $20.

The winning contestant or couple was given the opportunity to spend their score on at least one of several grand prizes at the "Sale of the Century". Contestants either purchased a prize with their winnings and retired, or elected to return the next day and try to win enough to buy a more expensive prize. Champions could buy more than one prize. Also, when contestants chose to return the next day, they were asked which prizes they were considering buying. As long as the contestant kept winning, those prizes remained while others were replaced by more expensive ones.

The 1973-74 syndicated version featured two different formats. Both offered three possible prizes (almost always a trip, a fur coat, and a car), only one of which the couple could win. Originally, each prize had a sale price, and Garagiola asked questions worth $100 each, which was added to the couple's score from the game. When the amount reached the sale price of a prize, the couple could buy the prize or keep playing for a more expensive prize. Later, this was changed to "The Game of Champions". The three prizes had sale amounts ($150, $300, and $600). The winning couple chose a prize and had to answer three questions (worth $50, $100, or $200 each, depending on the prize) in order to win.

1983–1989

Original format
Three contestants competed each day, usually a returning champion and two challengers, and were each given $20 at the start of the game. Except for Fame Game questions, contestants earned $5 for a correct answer and were penalized $5 for an incorrect answer. A contestant's score, however, could not be reduced below $0. Contestants could buzz-in before the question was finished, but had to answer based only on whatever information the host had read to that point.

Three Instant Bargains were played per game, with the prizes' retail values and sale prices increasing as the game progressed. In some cases, the host would reduce the price and/or offer extra cash to entice a contestant to make a purchase. During an Instant Bargain, only the player in the lead could purchase the prize available; in the event of a tie, the first player to buzz-in (if any) received the prize. For a brief time in early 1984, any contestant who bought an Instant Bargain could win back the money they spent by correctly answering a "Money Back Question" immediately afterward.

Three Fame Game rounds were played per game as well. The first half of each round consisted of a "who-am-I?"-style question, starting with obscure clues and proceeding to easier ones as the host continued. A contestant who buzzed in with a correct answer played the second half of the round; giving an incorrect answer eliminated a player from the round, but with no score penalty. If none of the contestants answered correctly, the second half of the round was skipped.

The contestant who answered correctly was given a choice of nine spaces on the Fame Game board, each displaying the face of a celebrity. Eight of the spaces hid either small bonus prizes or various amounts of cash, some of which offered the contestant a choice between taking either the money or an extra turn. Hidden behind one space was a $25 Money Card, which added that amount to the contestant's score. Spaces were removed from play as they were revealed. After the third playing, the host asked three final questions to end the game.

The contestant with the highest final score became the champion. If the match ended in a tie, the tied players were asked one more question. Buzzing in and answering correctly won the game, while answering incorrectly resulted in a loss. In both cases, the losing contestants kept all cash and prizes they had accumulated, including their final scores in cash.

Bonus Round
The champion was given a chance to buy a bonus prize with the money earned in all main game wins to that point. Six individual prizes were offered, which changed every five shows, and were arranged in ascending order of both retail value and sale price. A new champion was always allowed to buy the least expensive prize for either its sale price or the entire first game winning score, whichever was lower.

After a win, the champion could either buy the highest affordable prize and retire from the show, or return to play another match in the hopes of winning enough money to afford a higher-level prize. A defeated champion left with only the cash and prizes accumulated in the main game. Prizes on the uppermost levels included expensive jewelry, fur coats, and opulent trips with first-class accommodations, with a luxury automobile as the most common top prize.

Any champion who reached the top prize level was offered a chance to continue playing in the hope of earning enough money to buy all six shopping prizes. For the first five months of Sale's run on NBC, a champion had to accumulate $510 in total and the prize package was augmented with enough cash to bring its value up to $95,000. Later, an accumulating cash jackpot was added to the prize package and was available for purchase by itself at the same $510 price. The jackpot started at $50,000 and increased by $1,000 for each show it went unclaimed. With the introduction of the jackpot, the value for the entire prize package increased to $600. When the speed round was introduced in 1984, the prices for the jackpot and the complete prize package increased to $650 and $760, respectively.

The syndicated series featured a similar shopping round when it premiered in January 1985. Like its parent series, eight prize levels were available and a champion could elect to buy a prize at any time and retire. The final prize level, as before, was all of the shopping prizes and the cash jackpot. The difference was that the syndicated series did not offer the cash jackpot by itself as a prize. Instead, the car was the last individual prize offered and the seventh level consisted of all six shopping prizes without the jackpot. For the first three weeks of episodes, the shopping prizes cost $720 and the lot cost $830. These prices were respectively reduced to $640 and $750 on January 28, 1985, and remained there until the shopping format was discontinued in November of that year. During this period, the lot was won a total of four times, with the first win coming in February 1985 and the last in September 1985.

On rare occasions, a champion would enter a match needing a certain amount for one prize (such as a fur coat) and win with a high enough score to reach the one above it (such as a car). When such a situation arose, the champion was allowed to buy either of the two prizes but not both. If the next level involved multiple prizes, like the lot on the NBC series or all the shopping prizes on the syndicated series, there was no choice given between prizes. In the former case, the champion simply retired at the highest possible prize level. In the latter case, the champion faced the same decision after each victory: either to take all the shopping prizes and leave, or try to add the cash jackpot.

All the shopping prizes were swapped out for different ones every five shows. If a contestant's reign was to continue past the Friday of a particular week, the host offered a reminder that a different set of prizes would be offered beginning on the next show and told the champion what the next available prize in line would be.

Later changes

Main game
By July 1983, the Fame Game underwent two changes. The first involved the use of three Money Cards, worth $10, $15, and $25, which were added to the board one at a time in ascending order. Occasionally, a fourth card worth $5 was placed on the board with the $10 card. Later in March 1984, the famous faces on the Fame Game board were replaced by numbers, and for a brief time in late 1984, there was a "$5+" Money Card, entitling the contestant who found it to immediately pick another number and receive whatever was behind it in addition to the $5 score boost. Even later, in October 1985, a randomizer was added to the Fame Game board and the player in control hit their buzzer to freeze it and thus choose a number, similar to the CBS game show Press Your Luck. When this change was made, the locations of the Money Cards were shown to the players and the $5 card was discontinued.

The regular game format also underwent a significant change in March 1984 when the series followed the Australian Sale lead by replacing the final three questions after the last Fame Game with a 60-second speed round. To coincide with this change, Sale also increased the value of the shopping prizes. The price of the cash jackpot increased from $510 to $650, while the total amount needed to purchase the entire lot of prizes went from $600 to $760.

Beginning in May 1984, a "Sale Surprise" was occasionally and secretly added to certain Instant Bargains. It was only revealed after the contestant either purchased or passed on a prize, and consisted of a cash bonus in addition to any money the host might have already offered.

In March 1986, the third Instant Bargain was replaced by an "Instant Cash" game. The leading contestant was offered a chance at a cash jackpot at the cost of their entire lead over the second-place player. In case of a tie, the host named a starting price and gradually lowered it until one contestant buzzed in. Accepting the deal gave the player a choice of three boxes, two of which contained $100 each. The third box held the jackpot, which started at $1,000 and increased by that amount every day it went unclaimed.

Beginning in late December 1987, a prize was awarded to the winner of the match. Originally, there were six prizes on offer each week, each hidden behind a number, and the winner of the game received one of them. The prize was determined at first by the champion's selection of one number during the game, and later by the winner's selection at its end. Beginning in August 1988, the prize was predetermined before the show began and the host announced it before the match started.

Bonus round #2: The Winner's Board
The shopping bonus round was later replaced with a game called the "Winner's Board", which was introduced in October 1984 on NBC and on November 18, 1985 in syndication. On the Friday before the switch was made on both series, the champion was awarded the shopping prize entitled to based on how much money had been accumulated to that point.

Unlike before, where a contestant had to continue winning and build a bank to a certain amount to have a chance at one of the major prizes on the stage such as the car, the Winner's Board guaranteed that the contestant would receive one of 10 bonus prizes being offered during the broadcast week simply by matching it on the board. Every new champion's reign started with a full board of 20 squares.

Like before, there was a variety of prizes the champion could win. A car was always available, as were cash prizes of $3,000 and $10,000. There were also two "WIN" cards hidden on the board, which automatically awarded the next prize uncovered by the champion. Each prize had a matching pair except for the $10,000 cash prize and the car, which could only be matched by using a “WIN” card. No special bonus or prize was awarded for finding both cards on consecutive turns. 

The champion chose one square at a time until a prize was matched. When a prize was won, it was removed for all subsequent visits to the Winner's Board by that champion, but the two "WIN" cards were always in play. After a ninth victory, these cards were removed and two numbers were displayed, each concealing one of the two remaining prizes. The champion picked one number and won its prize, then automatically received the other one for a tenth win. If a champion was defeated before managing to reach ten wins, he/she kept whatever prizes that had been matched to that point. 

If the champion managed to win all ten prizes from the board, he/she was offered the opportunity to retire as champion or put those prizes at risk in one final match against two new challengers on the next show with a loss resulting in the prizes being lost. A win in the final match would add a $50,000 cash bonus to the champion’s previous total.

Bonus round #3: The Winner's Big Money Game
In December 1987, the show changed bonus rounds again and introduced a new round called the "Winner's Big Money Game". The champion was given a choice of three envelopes (red, yellow, blue) before the start of the round. Inside each of the envelopes was a series of six-word puzzles that served as clues to a famous person, place, or thing. To win, the champion had to solve a set amount of them within a time limit. The limit was originally five puzzles in 25 seconds, later reduced to four in 20 seconds. The clock began when the first word of a puzzle was revealed and stopped when the champion hit a plunger to stop the clock and give an answer. Passing was allowed, as was one incorrect guess. A second incorrect guess ended the round.

The Winner's Big Money Game had a series of eight prize levels, with the last two being a car and $50,000. Each of the first six were cash prizes that increased in value by $1,000 each time regardless of whether the round was won the day before or not. A new champion played for $5,000 on the first trip to the bonus round, $6,000 on the second trip, and so on up to $10,000 on the sixth.

If a champion reached a seventh Winner’s Big Money Game, winning the car would enable him/her to continue on as champion for a final match on the next program, where he/she would play for the $50,000 prize with a victory. If the champion did not win the car, he/she was retired as champion and three new contestants would compete on the next show.

Personnel

The 1969–1974 version began with Jack Kelly as host, who was replaced by Joe Garagiola in 1971. Bill Wendell, then on the staff of NBC, served as announcer for the entire 1969–1974 version. Madelyn Sanders, an African-American model, served as hostess for most of the run, along with several other female models.

The 1980s version was hosted by Jim Perry, who was initially joined by Sally Julian as co-host. Two months later, Lee Menning replaced her until December 28, 1984, when Summer Bartholomew joined the program and remained as co-host until the 1989 finale. Jay Stewart announced until his retirement in January 1988, when he was replaced by Don Morrow.

Production information

Broadcast history
Sale of the Century premiered on September 29, 1969, on NBC's daytime schedule at 11:00a.m. (10:00a.m. Central), replacing the two-year-old Personality, which was hosted by Larry Blyden. It aired at that time slot for the whole of its initial four years on the network, ending its first run on July 13, 1973, after which The Wizard of Odds—the first American program hosted by Alex Trebek—made its debut. Shortly after NBC cancelled the daytime version of the program, it returned in first-run weekly syndication in September 1973, with the same format as in the final NBC weeks. However, relatively few stations took the program, which usually aired on a weeknight before primetime programming, and not enough of them were interested in a second season, so the New York-based production was discontinued in 1974.

The 1983 revival debuted on NBC on January 3 of that year at 10:30a.m. (9:30a.m. Central) and remained there until January 2, 1987. Replacing Wheel of Fortune, the show that belonged in the time slot from April 1982 to December 1982, the show faced competition against Child's Play at the same time slot on CBS (ABC did not begin programming until 11:00a.m.) from January to September 1983, then Press Your Luck from September 1983 to January 1986, then Card Sharks from January 1986 to 1987. On January 5, 1987, the network moved the show ahead thirty minutes to 10:00a.m. (9:00a.m. Central). Sale of the Century stayed in that timeslot for the remainder of its run, enjoying respectable ratings. It faced competition with three CBS game shows airing at that same timeslot: The $25,000 Pyramid (for the entirety of 1987 and the spring of 1988), Blackout (which aired from January to April 1988), and Family Feud (which premiered in July 1988). The program's 1,578th and final episode aired on March 24, 1989.

Its place on the schedule was taken by Scrabble, which had been airing in the afternoons for several years, in a shuffle that also saw Super Password end after four-and-a-half seasons (its timeslot of 12:00 PM was given back to its affiliates) and the soap opera Generations inherit its place and Scrabble'''s old timeslot.

The revival series spawned an accompanying daily syndicated edition that premiered on January 7, 1985, and was distributed by Genesis Entertainment. The syndicated Sale of the Century was renewed for a full second season, but not enough stations were willing to pick it up for a third season and the series came to an end following the 1985–86 season.

Episode status
Most episodes of the original NBC 1969–1973 series are believed to have been destroyed, but nine episodes of that run are held by the UCLA Film and Television Archive. The status of the 1973–74 syndicated run is unknown. 

USA aired reruns of the entire 270–episode 1985–86 syndicated series, and 120 episodes (August 1988 – March 1989) of the NBC daytime series from September 14, 1992, to July 29, 1994, for a total of 390 episodes.

GSN carried the series from April 1, 2013, until March 27, 2015. The network initially started out by airing the final sixty-five episodes of the NBC series. As part of the weekend beginning with that year's Black Friday, the network aired a four-hour marathon of episodes from the first season of the syndicated series to pay tribute to many retailers offering sales. GSN added the syndicated episodes to its daytime lineup in place of the network episodes that Monday and aired most of the run before dropping Sale from their schedule.

On October 18, 2015, Buzzr added the syndicated episodes to their Sunday night lineup, which later moved to the weeknight lineup in the summer of 2017. In July 2018, the show moved to the weekday morning lineup, and in July 2019, the network added NBC episodes to its rotation, starting from episode 1410, in July 1988.

Theme music
The original 1969–1974 theme was composed by Al Howard and Irwin Bazelon.

The main theme on the 1980s version was composed in 1982 by Ray Ellis and his son, Marc, and was more or less a reworking of Jack Grimsley's original 1980 recording for the Australian version of the show. The show introduced a synthesized version of the Ellis theme in 1987.

Licensed merchandise
Milton Bradley released two home editions based on the 1969–1974 version. A version based upon the 1983–1989 version of the show – made by American Publishing Corp, and featuring the Quizzard game – was released in 1986.

As part of their "Game Show Greats" lineup, IGT released a video slot machine in 2003.

International versions
Prior to purchasing the rights to Sale of the Century in 1980, media mogul Reg Grundy produced Great Temptation'', a similar show that aired on Australian television from 1970 to 1974. His Australian version of Sale of the Century ran from 1980 to 2001. Reg Grundy Productions distributed the format internationally until 1995 when the company was sold to Pearson Television, which became known as Fremantle in 2001.

See also 
 Temptation (2007 American game show)

References

External links
 Museum of Broadcast Communications article on the show
 
 

 
1969 American television series debuts
1974 American television series endings
1983 American television series debuts
1989 American television series endings
1960s American game shows
1970s American game shows
1980s American game shows
English-language television shows
First-run syndicated television programs in the United States
NBC original programming
Television series by Reg Grundy Productions
Television series by Fremantle (company)
Television series by 20th Century Fox Television
Television series by Sony Pictures Television
American television series revived after cancellation